Khevsurians are an ethnic sub-group of Georgians, mainly living in Khevsureti, on both sides of the Caucasus Mountain Chain in the watersheds of the rivers Aragvi and Argun. There are some villages in Khevi, Ertso-Tianeti, Kakheti (Shiraki), Kvemo Kartli (Gardabani) also where Khevsurians reside. Khevsurians speak the Georgian language in Khevsurian dialect. For a long time, Khevsurians have maintained their traditional culture: clothing, weapons, and polyphonic music. 

Khevsurians first are mentioned in the 10th-century manuscripts. In 1745 they were described by Vakhushti Bagrationi in his work Description of the Kingdom of Georgia.

In the old Georgian chronicle, Khevsureti and Pshavi are referred to together as "Pkhovi", while the Pshavians and Khevsurians themselves were called "Pkhoveli". This is evidenced by the reference of Vakhushti. He says in the description of the north-eastern part of Heret-Kakheti: "But they are called Pshav Khevsur, who previously were called Pkhoelni"

The Kists bordering Khevsureti still call Khevsureti "Pkhia" or "Pkhye", which means the same Pkhoeli

Anthropologically Khevsurians have a slim, east Georgian type of face; due to harsh living conditions in mountain areas, many of them are thin. Khevsurians generally have light colored eyes and hair color ranging from blonde to brown.

References

Further reading

 Sherman, R. (2021). "Kicking the Crusaders out of the Caucasus: Deconstructing the 200-Year-Old Meme that the Khevsurs Descended from a Lost Band of Medieval Knights." Nationalities Papers, 49(1), 54-71.

External links

 Sword and Buckler Fighting among the Lost Crusaders

People from Georgia (country) by ethnic or national origin